The Sorrow of War ( is a 1991 novel by the Vietnamese writer Bảo Ninh. The novel was Ninh's graduation project at the Nguyen Du Writing School in Hanoi. It tells the story of a soldier who is collecting dead bodies after the war and then begins to think about his past. The novel won the Independent Foreign Fiction Prize. The novel was banned until 2006 by the Communist Party of Vietnam.

Original and English version
Bảo Ninh achieved prominence in Hanoi with the first version of the novel, Thân phận của tình yêu (English: The Destiny (Identity) of Love), published on a Roneo duplicator (similar to a mimeograph) before 1990. Soon afterwards Phan Thanh Hao translated it into English and took the manuscript to the British publishers Secker & Warburg. Geoffrey Mulligan, an editor there, commissioned Frank Palmos, an Australian journalist who had reported on the Vietnam War and written about it in his book Ridding the Devils (1990), to write an English version based on the raw translation. Bao Ninh had read Phan Thanh Hao's Vietnamese translation of Ridding the Devils and willingly agreed to this suggestion. After several meetings with both the author and the translator, Hao, in Hanoi, and journeys throughout Vietnam to check details, Palmos wrote the English version over seven months in secret in his home in Warwick, a suburb of Perth, Western Australia. It was published in 1994 under the title The Sorrow of War.

Counterfeits of the English version became widely available in Vietnam, aimed at the tourist trade. Counterfeit sales have reportedly far exceeded sales of the original edition. In November 2017 the Book Distributors Guild of Vietnam named the English version of Sorrow as the biggest selling Vietnamese book in the country's history.

In 2006, fifteen years after its publication, the ban on the book was lifted, and the English edition appeared across bookshops and newsstands in Vietnam. The Sorrow of War was then published in Vietnamese, under the title Nỗi buồn chiến tranh.

It has since been translated into 14 other languages, most from the Palmos English version. The versions directly translated from the Vietnamese include the French version by Phan Huy Đường in 1994, the Japanese version by Okawa Hitoshi() in 1999 and the Chinese version by Xia Lu() in 2019.

Overview
The Sorrow of War, written in the stream of consciousness style, opens with a depiction of soldiers on a postwar mission to collect the bones of fallen comrades for reburial. Thus begins the non-linear narrative by Kien, a North Vietnamese soldier during the Vietnam War, chronicling his loss of innocence, his love, and his anguish at the memories of war.

Kien rides in the truck searching for the remains of fallen soldiers in what he imagines as the "jungle of screaming souls, and recalls that this is where the 27th Battalion was obliterated except for a handful of survivors. His flashbacks tie the novel together. The theme of these flashbacks centers around the love between Kien and his childhood sweetheart, Phuong. Kien writes a novel about it, then tries to burn it. A mute girl whom Kien sees when drunk, to whom he pours out his thoughts, obtains the text after his departure. Kien, in the book, reflects on his experiences, on the many unacknowledged sacrifices, such as Hoa giving up her life to save Kien and his comrades from American soldiers, and acts of immorality and desecration, such as the objectification and treatment of a dead woman in the airport. The novel climaxes with Kien's reflections on his first personal kill, which occurs after he witnesses Phuong's rape. The novel ends with a passage by a new narrator, who explains that he received Kien's novel from the mute girl.

Reception
Michael Fathers of The Independent noted how both American and Vietnamese cultural depictions of the Vietnam War had tended to be full of romanticisation and stereotyping, and wrote: "The Sorrow of War soars above all this. ... It moves backwards and forwards in time, and in and out of despair, dragging you down as the hero-loner leads you through his private hell in the highlands of Central Vietnam, or pulling you up when his spirits rise. It is a fine war novel and a marvellous book."

The British author-photographer Tim Page and others have compared the novel favorably to Erich Maria Remarque's All Quiet on the Western Front.

The British newspaper The Independent judged The Sorrow of War the Best Foreign Book of 1994. The prize money was equally shared by the author, Bao Ninh, the translator, Phan Thanh Hao, and Frank Palmos, the author of the English version for publication. In 2010, the British Society of Authors listed the translation as one of the Best 50 Translations of the previous century.

See also
 1990 in literature
 Vietnamese literature

References

1990 novels
Vietnamese novels
Novels set during the Vietnam War